Haji Bakr Al-Qahtani (born 6 November 1964) is a Saudi Arabian sprinter. He competed in the men's 400 metres at the 1988 Summer Olympics.

References

1964 births
Living people
Athletes (track and field) at the 1988 Summer Olympics
Saudi Arabian male sprinters
Saudi Arabian male middle-distance runners
Olympic athletes of Saudi Arabia
Place of birth missing (living people)